Kameron Alexander is an American singer, songwriter, and record producer from Pasadena, California. After graduating high school, Kameron went on to pursue audio engineering full-time at the Los Angeles Recording School, during which he also apprenticed under Grammy Award-winning singer, songwriter and record producer Raphael Saadiq. After spending a few years under his wing, Kameron went on to work at Larrabee Studios in North Hollywood; where, he would be mentored by world-class mixer Dave Pensado. After spending time learning from some of the best mixers and producers in the industry, Kameron began the approach of songwriting and production. Since then, Kameron has signed a publishing deal with Sony/ATV and has worked with artists and producers such as Frank Ocean, Jacob Banks, Kelly Rowland, Little Big Town, Parson James, LP, Meghan Trainor, Malay Ho, Arlissa, No I.D., Illenium, Jamie Miller, Michael Bolton, J.R. Rotem, Frank E, A$AP Rocky, & Alan Walker, Marshmello.

Discography

Artist, writer and composer credits

Technical credits

Chart performance

LOTTO – Repackaged album (Korean and Chinese versions)

Combined versions

"Pray" – Illenium feat. Kameron Alexander (single from album Ascend )

References

External links
Instagram

1988 births
Living people
Record producers from California
21st-century American singers